The 1980 Porsche Tennis Grand Prix was a women's singles tennis tournament played on indoor carpet courts at the Tennis Sporthalle Filderstadt in Filderstadt in West Germany. The event was part of the AAA category of the 1980 Colgate Series. It was the third edition of the tournament and was held from 3 November through 9 November 1980. First-seeded Tracy Austin won the singles event, her third successive singles title at the event, and the accompanying $22,000 first-prize money.

Finals

Singles
 Tracy Austin defeated  Sherry Acker 6–2, 7–5
It was Austin's 10th title of the year and the 20th of her career.

Doubles
 Hana Mandlíková /  Betty Stöve defeated  Kathy Jordan /  Anne Smith 6–4, 7–5

Prize money

Notes

References

External links
 
 Women's Tennis Association (WTA) tournament profile
 International Tennis Federation (ITF) tournament event details
  Women's Tennis Association (WTA) tournament event details

Porsche Tennis Grand Prix
1980 in German tennis
Porsche Tennis Grand Prix
1980s in Baden-Württemberg
Porsch